Ens is a hamlet in Hoodoo No. 401, Saskatchewan, Canada. The hamlet is located at the intersections of Highway 2 and Township road 432, approximately 8 km north of the Town of Wakaw.

See also

 List of communities in Saskatchewan
 Hamlets of Saskatchewan

References

External links

Hoodoo No. 401, Saskatchewan
Unincorporated communities in Saskatchewan
Division No. 15, Saskatchewan